Peristeres is an island in Greece, to the west of Corfu, where it belongs administratively. It is the site of a lighthouse since 1826 and is inhabited by 1 person according to the Greek census of 2011.

The small island and its lighthouse are visible from the southern Albanian coastal area containing the cities of Saranda and Ksamil.

References 

Landforms of Corfu (regional unit)
Islands of Greece